The 1997 Air Force Falcons football team competed for the United States Air Force Academy in the 1998 NCAA Division I-A football season. The team was led by 14th-year head coach Fisher DeBerry and played its home games at Falcon Stadium. It finished the regular season with a 10–2 record overall and a 6–2 record in Western Athletic Conference games. The team was selected to play in the Las Vegas Bowl, in which it lost to Oregon.

Schedule

Personnel

Awards and honors
 Frank Mindrup, 1st Team All-WAC

References

Air Force
Air Force Falcons football seasons
Air Force Falcons football